Ocean County Vocational Technical School Grunin Performing Arts Academy (or PAA for short) is a specialized, public high school program which concentrates heavily on the fields of performing arts such as dance, vocal music, and theater, serving students in ninth through twelfth grades from all of Ocean County, New Jersey, United States. Located in Toms River on the campus of Ocean County College, it is the sister high school of the Marine Academy of Technology and Environmental Sciences, another full-time program that is also part of the Ocean County Vocational Technical School district. Because the school is a full-time program, students take both their performance major and academic courses at the school. The school is accredited by the Middle States Association of Colleges and Schools Commission on Elementary and Secondary Schools through July 2027.

As of the 2021–22 school year, the school had an enrollment of 284 students and 31.1 classroom teachers (on an FTE basis), for a student–teacher ratio of 9.1:1. There were 16 students (5.6% of enrollment) eligible for free lunch and 5 (1.8% of students) eligible for reduced-cost lunch.

History
In January 2020, the OCVTS Grunin Performing Arts Academy moved from its original facility in Lakehurst to a new building located on the Ocean County College campus. The  facility was constructed at a cost of $27 million, with about $11 million covered by the State of New Jersey, $8 million by the County of Ocean and $8 million received from the Jay and Linda Grunin Foundation.

Awards, recognition and rankings
Schooldigger.com ranked the school tied for 173rd out of 381 public high schools statewide in its 2011 rankings (a decrease of 139 positions from the 2010 ranking) which were based on the combined percentage of students classified as proficient or above proficient on the mathematics (78.5%) and language arts literacy (95.3%) components of the High School Proficiency Assessment (HSPA).

Students at the school have won numerous awards such as state-level and international level rankings at the New Jersey Thespian Festival and International Thespian Society Festival. The school, staff, and students also hold achievements at the Montclair State University Theatre Night Awards and Paper Mill Playhouse Awards for their work in school productions.

Curriculum 
PAA relies heavily on block scheduling; each year is broken up into two semesters and each semester consists of four 80-minute, 5-credit classes. Every class offered is either an honors course or college-prep course because the high school is designed to test and challenge the brightest students both academically and in performance.

Notable alumni
 Elijah Boothe, actor best known for his role in Luke Cage.
 Brigid Harrington, actress, singer, dancer and voice artist.

References

External links
School website
Ocean County Vocational Technical School website

School Data for the Ocean County Vocational Technical School, National Center for Education Statistics

Toms River, New Jersey
2001 establishments in New Jersey
Educational institutions established in 2001
Public high schools in Ocean County, New Jersey
Schools of the performing arts in the United States